Pawtucket City Hall is located at 137 Roosevelt Avenue, just outside the central business district of Pawtucket, Rhode Island. The Art Deco-style building was designed by Providence architect John O'Malley and was built in 1933–1936, its cost subsidized by funds from the Works Progress Administration.

Building description
The design of the central wing and tower derives, whether consciously or not, from the Nebraska State Capitol, an influential building, designed by architect Bertram Goodhue in 1920, and completed in 1932.

The main block is flanked by two wings, faced in brick, with pitched roofs, each six bays wide and three stories high (plus a basement level), which house the Pawtucket City Hall offices. The two principal wings each extend to secondary projecting wings that are two stories high, faced in brick, with flat roofs giving them a more utilitarian character. The north wing houses the central fire station, while the south wing houses the police department headquarters.

The building was added to the National Register of Historic Places in 1983. In 1999, it made a brief appearance in the movie Outside Providence.

Gallery

See also
 National Register of Historic Places listings in Pawtucket, Rhode Island

References

City and town halls on the National Register of Historic Places in Rhode Island
Buildings and structures in Pawtucket, Rhode Island
City halls in Rhode Island
Art Deco architecture in Rhode Island
National Register of Historic Places in Pawtucket, Rhode Island